Denmark participated in the Eurovision Song Contest 2021 with the song "" written by Laurits Emanuel. The song was performed by the duo . The Danish broadcaster DR organised the national final  in order to select the Danish entry for the 2021 contest in Rotterdam, Netherlands.

Denmark was drawn to compete in the second semi-final of the Eurovision Song Contest which took place on 20 May 2021. Performing as the closing entry during the show in position 17, "" was not announced among the top 10 entries of the second semi-final and therefore did not qualify to compete in the final. It was later revealed that Denmark placed eleventh out of the 17 participating countries in the semi-final with 89 points.

Background 

In , Ben and Tan were set to represent the country with the song "Yes" before the contest's cancellation.

The Danish national broadcaster, DR, broadcasts the event within Denmark and organises the selection process for the nation's entry. DR confirmed their intentions to participate at the 2020 Eurovision Song Contest on 3 April 2020. Denmark has selected all of their Eurovision entries thus far through the national final . Along with their participation confirmation, the broadcaster announced that  would be organised in order to select Denmark's entry for the 2021 contest.

Before Eurovision

Dansk Melodi Grand Prix 2021
The national final was watched by 1.532 million viewers in Denmark, making it the most watched edition of  since .

Format 
Eight songs competed in one show where the winner was determined over two rounds of public voting. In the first round, the top three songs qualified to the superfinal, during which the winner was determined. Viewers were able to vote via SMS or a mobile application specifically designed for the competition. Viewers using the app to cast a vote were provided with one free vote. The DR Grand Prix Orchestra conducted by Peter Düring also accompanied each performance in varying capacities during the show.

Competing entries 
DR opened a submission period between 29 October 2020 and 20 November 2020 for artists and composers to submit their entries. The spokesperson for the Dansk Melodi Grand Prix, Gustav Lützhøft, stated that the competition would seek out "songs that reflect Danish culture and identity with a diversity of both genres and musical expressions" with emphasis on songs that have the potential for further success after the competition. A selection committee of industry professionals selected eight songs from the entries submitted to the broadcaster. Among the competing artists was Mike Tramp who represented Denmark in the Eurovision Song Contest 1978 as part of the band Mabel.

Final 
The final took place on 6 March 2021. The running order was determined by DR and announced on 25 February 2021. In the first round of voting the top three advanced to a superfinal based on a public vote. In addition to the performances of the competing entries, Andreas Odbjerg performed the Danish Eurovision 1995 entry "" as the interval act.

At Eurovision 

According to Eurovision rules, all nations with the exceptions of the host country and the "Big Five" (France, Germany, Italy, Spain, and the United Kingdom) are required to qualify from one of two semi-finals in order to compete in the final; the top ten countries from each semi-final progress to the final. The European Broadcasting Union (EBU) split up the competing countries into six different pots based on voting patterns from previous contests, with countries with favourable voting histories put into the same pot. The semi-final allocation draw held for the Eurovision Song Contest 2020 on 28 January 2020 was used for the 2021 contest, which Denmark was placed into the second semi-final, to be held on 20 May 2021, and was scheduled to perform in the second half of the show.

Once all the competing songs for the 2021 contest had been released, the running order for the semi-finals was decided by the shows' producers rather than through another draw, so that similar songs were not placed next to each other. Denmark was set to perform last in position, following the entry from Switzerland.

The two semi-finals and final were broadcast on DR1 with commentary by Henrik Milling and Nicolai Molbech. The Danish spokesperson, who announced the top 12-point score awarded by the Danish jury during the final, was Tina Müller.

Semi-final 
 took part in technical rehearsals on 11 and 14 May, followed by dress rehearsals on 19 and 20 May. This included the jury show on 19 May where the professional juries of each country watched and voted on the competing entries.

The Danish performance featured the members of  dressed in 80s inspired outfits and performing with three backing vocalists. The performance began with the duo on two circular platforms, which lead singer Jesper Groth later left jumped off towards the satellite stage and finished the performance back onto his platform with pyrotechnic effects. The stage colours were predominantly pink and light blue and the LED screens displayed squares and lines of the same colours. The three backing vocalists that joined  were: Line Krogholm, Marcel Gbekle and Tilde Vinther.

At the end of the show, Denmark was not announced among the top 10 entries in the second semi-final and therefore failed to qualify to compete in the final. It was later revealed that Denmark placed eleventh in the semi-final, receiving a total of 89 points: 80 points from the televoting and 9 points from the juries.

Voting 
Voting during the three shows involved each country awarding two sets of points from 1-8, 10, and 12: one from their professional jury and the other from televoting. Each nation's jury consisted of five music industry professionals who are citizens of the country they represent, with a diversity in gender and age represented. The judges assess each entry based on the performances during the second Dress Rehearsal of each show, which takes place the night before each live show, against a set of criteria including vocal capacity; the stage performance; the song's composition and originality; and the overall impression by the act. Jury members may only take part in the panel once every three years and are obliged to confirm that they are not connected to any of the participating acts in a way that would impact their ability to vote impartially. Jury members should also vote independently, with no discussion of their vote permitted with other jury members. The exact composition of the professional jury, and the results of each country's jury and televoting were released after the grand final; the individual results from each jury member were also released in an anonymised form.

Below is a breakdown of points awarded to Denmark and awarded by Denmark in the second semi-final and grand final of the contest, and the breakdown of the jury voting and televoting conducted during the two shows:

Points awarded to Denmark

Points awarded by Denmark

Detailed voting results 
The following members comprised the Danish jury:
 Julie Aagaard (Kill J)
 
 Lise Cabble
 Peter Düring
 Jonas Schroeder

References

External links
 

2021
Countries in the Eurovision Song Contest 2021
Eurovision